Coolgardie may refer to:

Coolgardie, Western Australia
Shire of Coolgardie
Coolgardie bioregion
Coolgardie woodlands